Oleh Polischuk (born 17 April 1991 in Igarka, Krasnoyarsk Krai, Russian SFSR, Soviet Union) is a professional Ukrainian football defender who plays for FC Desna Chernihiv in the Ukrainian Second League.

Polischuk began his playing career with FC Dynamo Kyiv's third team. He joined Sevastopol, where he played for the second team until he was promoted to the first team in 2010. He made his first team debut entering as a second-half substitute against FC Arsenal Bila Tserkva on 8 April 2010.

In March 2010, Polischuk was called up to the Ukraine national under-19 football team for a series of friendly matches against France in preparation for the 2010 UEFA European Under-19 Championship.

References

External links 
 Profile on Sevstopol club site (Rus)
 Profile at Official FFU site (Ukr)

1991 births
Living people
Ukrainian footballers
FC Desna Chernihiv players
FC Sevastopol players
Association football defenders